The Crow Road is a four-part television miniseries by BBC Scotland in 1996, based faithfully on the 1992 novel of the same name by Scottish novelist Iain Banks. It was directed by Gavin Millar.

Summary
The cast includes Joseph McFadden as Prentice McHoan, Bill Paterson as his father, Dougray Scott as his older brother (another, younger brother in the novel has been written out here) and Peter Capaldi as his missing uncle Rory, who via a narrative device employed in the adaptation, visits the thoughtful Prentice when he is alone. The production was nominated as Best Drama Serial at the 1997 British Academy Television Awards. Following the success of this TV serial, the same team went on to adapt Banks's Complicity as a feature film.

Cast
 Joseph McFadden as Prentice McHoan
 Bill Paterson as Kenneth McHoan
 Peter Capaldi as Rory McHoan
 Valerie Edmond as Ashley Watt
 Dougray Scott as Lewis McHoan
 David Robb as Fergus Urvill
 Elizabeth Sinclair as Mary McHoan
 Gudrun Ure as Margot McHoan
 Patricia Kerrigan as Janice
 Simone Bendix as Verity Walker
 Paul Young as Hamish McHoan
 Stella Gonet as Fiona Urvill
 Claire Nielson as Antonia McHoan
 Edward Casey as Young Prentice McHoan

Critical reception
Reviewing the DVD box set  in 2015, The Guardian wrote "the best TV adaptations capture the spirit of the original while adding something of their own – and The Crow Road, which first aired almost 20 years ago, is one of the finest adaptations of them all, managing to distil Bank’s complex tale into four hours of sharply evocative TV."

Episodes

References

External links
 

Location guide

1996 Scottish television series debuts
1996 Scottish television series endings
1990s British drama television series
BBC Scotland television shows
BBC television dramas
1990s British television miniseries
English-language television shows
Television shows based on British novels
1990s Scottish television series
Films directed by Gavin Millar